Repercussion (latinized form of "repeating" or "rebounding") is a special vocal singing technique consisting on singing a tone with a constant pitch.

The technique has been and is especially used in Gregorian chant where repetitions of sounds are prescribed by certain neumes, such as a distropha or a tristropha. The vocals are modulated in volume, without necessarily resulting in a pitch fluctuation, or a vibrato. If the singing is not performed by a soloist, the singers modulate their voices in unison according to the direction of the cantor. The perfect singing of repercussion requires vocal training and appropriate respiratory support.

A similar term, which means something different, is the word "repercussa". This is another name for the recitation tone, an important structural tone within the church modes.

See also

 Gregorian mode
 Tremolo

Musical performance techniques

References